Gu Hongyu (born January 31, 1971, in Beijing) is a retired male beach volleyball player from the People's Republic of China. He won the gold medal in the men's team competition at the 1998 Asian Games, partnering compatriot Li Hua.

Playing partners
 Li Hua

References
 

1971 births
Living people
Chinese beach volleyball players
Men's beach volleyball players
Asian Games medalists in beach volleyball
Beach volleyball players at the 1998 Asian Games
Volleyball players from Beijing
Asian Games gold medalists for China
Medalists at the 1998 Asian Games